The Lycée Claudel d'Ottawa is a French-language  private school in Ottawa built in the early 1960s. It was renovated by Edward J. Cuhaci to provide an infill between two existing school buildings comprising classrooms and a 600-seat auditorium.  It is located on Lycée Place (formerly Old Riverside Drive). The school has approximately 1000 students in grades JK-12. It is named after the French poet Paul Claudel, and follows the French international curriculum. All classes, with the exception of language classes, are taught in French, and students complete the French baccalaureat at the end of grade 12 (called "Terminale").  The Lycée Paul Claudel has the highest average results among French overseas schools (of which there are over 300) as of Spring 2013.

Program
The school is also competitive in many fields; it has been junior boys' soccer champion and tennis champion in both boys' and girls' categories in the city of Ottawa. Students François Le Moine, Philippe Boisvert and Jean-Christophe Martel were National French Debating Champions of Canada in 2001, 2002 and 2003. Christine Mikolajuk and Greta Levy were Regional, Provincial and National Bilingual Debating Champions in 2002 and 2004, respectively. Three students, Fatoumata Diane, Jasmine Sander Preston and Fatma Zaguia, won the Canadian finale of the World French Language Trophies and were invited to France for the world finale hosted by famous French TV hosts Julien Lepers and Bernard Pivot. They ended up bringing back the victory for Claudel. The University of Ottawa's Gee-Gees star Pilar Khoury is also an alumnus of the school.

Alumni
As the school is located in Canada's national capital, some Canadian politicians' children are among its alumni, including those of former Canadian Prime Ministers Pierre Trudeau and Brian Mulroney, and Quebec Premier Rene Levesque. Hockey player Alex Kovalev's children also attended the school.

See also
Agence pour l'enseignement français à l'étranger

References

External links

 Lycée Claudel d'Ottawa

Private schools in Ottawa
Claudel
Middle schools in Ottawa
High schools in Ottawa
International Baccalaureate schools in Ontario
French international schools in Canada